Tiit Mae (born 28 February 1960) is an Estonian politician. He was a member of X Riigikogu.

Early life
Mae was born in Kohtla-Järve. He is a 1978 graduate of Tallinn 39th Secondary School.

Career
Mae was elected to X Riigikogu in 2003, representing the People's Union of Estonia. He was also a member of the Committee on European Union Affairs and former municipal elder of Keila Parish.

References

Living people
1960 births
People's Union of Estonia politicians
Members of the Riigikogu, 2003–2007
People from Kohtla-Järve